Ingleborough is the second-highest mountain in the Yorkshire Dales, England. It is one of the Yorkshire Three Peaks (the other two being Whernside and Pen-y-ghent), and is frequently climbed as part of the Three Peaks walk.  A large part of Ingleborough is designated as a Site of Special Scientific Interest and National Nature Reserve and is the home of a new joint project, Wild Ingleborough, with aims to improve the landscape for wildlife and people.

Name
The first element of the name "Ingleborough" has been variably explained as a Scots term for 'beacon, fire', an Old Danish term meaning 'English' or a derivative of Old English ing, 'peak'. The second element is derived from the Old English word burh, meaning "a fortified place"; in this case, a hill fort.  The summit plateau of Ingleborough is encircled by the remains of a massive stone rampart, containing the foundations of Iron Age huts.

Geography

Ingleborough is in the south-western corner of the Yorkshire Dales, at the highest point of a triangle of land with corners at Ingleton, Ribblehead and Settle.

Ingleborough throws out a ridge to the north-east which develops into a summit, Simon Fell, and another summit further down, Park Fell. On the slopes of the former are the famed Norber Boulders. Continuing south-east the high land is broken by a divide carrying the minor road from Austwick to Helwith Bridge. On the other side of the divide the low summit of Smearsett Scar rises along with its subsidiaries, Pot Scar and Giggleswick Scar; from here the land falls away to the River Ribble at Settle.

On the western side of Ingleborough is a large limestone plateau appropriately known as White Scars. The plateau is bounded by Raven Scar, the longest unbroken cliff in the district, and on top of it is the pothole of Meregill Hole. On the southern side (west of the Clapham path) is a similar plateau, containing potholes such as Fluted Hole and Pillar Hole.

Also here is Juniper Gulf, which descends  underground through an arduous rift, dominated by a small geological fault.

The Smearsett Scar region contains the Celtic Wall, the Ebbing and Flowing Well (which has now stopped ebbing and flowing) and a glacial hollow known as the Happy Valley.

Ascents
There are several popular hillwalking routes to its summit. An ascent from here is about  there and back. The route follows a walled lane, Fell Lane, before emerging onto a flat area, Crina Bottom, scattered with potholes including the considerable Quaking Pot. A steep climb through the limestone cliffs leads to the summit.

The hill may also be climbed from Horton in Ribblesdale  to the east, following a route crossing extensive areas of limestone pavement in the region of Sulber Nick. This is the route of descent of the Three Peaks Walk and has been heavily improved by the National Trust, having changed in just thirty years from no path at all to a serious example of footpath erosion. Another route on this flank is from the isolated farmstead of Crummack.

There is also a route from Clapham that follows the Ingleborough Estate nature trail, before passing the Craven Fault, the showcave of Ingleborough Cave, the ravine of Trow Gill and the pothole of Gaping Gill. It then crosses a marshy area and climbs up to the shoulder of Little Ingleborough before following the ridge to the summit. The return to Clapham can be varied by taking the Horton-in-Ribblesdale path for  before striking south through more limestone pavement to the small top of Norber; a descent past the famed Norber erratics (Norber Boulders) finishes a walk of  that Wainwright considered the finest walk in the Yorkshire Dales.

An alternative route from the south-west side of the triangle starts at Newby Cote, roughly a mile northwest of Clapham on the minor road heading towards Ingleton.  This path proceeds ENE until it joins the main path from Clapham about a mile from the summit.

There is a northern route from the Hill Inn at Chapel-le-Dale, the route of ascent used by the Three Peaks Walk and the shortest way up the mountain, being just  from village to summit. The passage from here to the summit is high-level and exhilarating, but requires some scrambling.

Finally there are unwaymarked routes heading NE across Simon Fell and Souther Scales Fell both of which reach a steep descent just beyond the triangulation pillar on Park Fell to reach the Right of Way at New Close. Both routes give commanding views of the area.

The summit

The summit is a broad plateau half a mile in circumference, slightly convex, higher to the north-west than to the south-east, and carpeted with dry turf. There is an Ordnance Survey trig point (number S. 5619) at the highest point, near the western corner. Just to the north is a well-built windshelter (cross-shaped to provide shelter whichever way the wind is blowing) with a view indicator or toposcope built into its centre. Between them is a large cairn. At the point where the Ingleton path reaches the summit rim is an even larger cairn; this, remarkably, is the remains of a battlemented round tower (a hospice), built in 1830. The celebrations on the day of its opening ceremony became so alcoholic, however, that parts of it were thrown down there and then, the rest being destroyed later.

Along the northern and eastern edges of the plateau are the tumbled remains of a wall, once believed to have been a Roman military camp but now known to be an Iron Age hill fort. For the view, which is far-reaching and superb, see here. It is now thought that this was in fact Celtic, built by the Brigantes, the largest amalgamation of tribes in Iron Age Britain. The fort was known to the Romans as the Kings Fort. It may be that this was a base for Venutius after his 'divorce' from Cartimandua, the Brigantes Queen who was a supporter of the Roman invaders, unlike Venutius who led several rebellions. What we do know is that this fort was used all year, which was unusual for such a location, but at the time of the Romans the climate was much milder, the Romans for example cultivating grapes in Newcastle.

Geology
The striking appearance of Ingleborough from all directions and from a great distance is due to the unusual geology of the underlying rock. The base of the mountain is composed of ancient Silurian and Ordovician rocks which are exposed in the valley bottoms to the north of Ingleton. Due to the limestone's permeability, all the streams flowing down from the mountain are engulfed upon reaching it, falling into a number of potholes. Above lies the layered Yoredale Series of sedimentary rocks, predominantly shale and sandstone, and generally concealed by the peat but revealed in the escarpments about  up. There are also layers of harder limestone sandwiched between the softer rocks which have been eroded faster, and which protect the layers beneath them, leading to the 'tiered' effect. The rock above the Millstone Grit layer has been eroded away, which explains the comparative flatness of the summit. A good explanation of the geology and scenery of the area is given in Waltham.

The view
Important mountain peaks visible from Ingleborough are listed here, clockwise from north, with their distance in miles and bearing in degrees.

North to east
 Wild Boar Fell, 15 miles, 5 degrees
 Mickle Fell, 31 miles, 7 degrees
 High Seat, 17 miles, 12 degrees
 Great Knoutberry Hill, 8 miles, 21 degrees
 Great Shunner Fell, 16 miles, 26 degrees
 Lovely Seat, 15 miles, 34 degrees
 Dodd Fell Hill, 9 miles, 45 degrees
 Yockenthwaite Moor, 11 miles, 69 degrees
 Buckden Pike, 14 miles, 79 degrees
 Plover Hill, 7 miles, 87 degrees

East to south
 Great Whernside, 16 miles, 92 degrees
 Pen-y-ghent, 6 miles, 98 degrees
 Fountains Fell, 8 miles, 105 degrees
 Thorpe Fell Top, 19 miles, 119 degrees
 Ilkley Moor, 30 miles, 128 degrees
 Rye Loaf Hill, 10 miles, 132 degrees
 Boulsworth Hill, 27 miles, 155 degrees
 Kinder Scout, 58 miles, 159 degrees
 Shining Tor, 65 miles, 166 degrees
 Pendle Hill, 21 miles, 169 degrees

South to west
 Winter Hill, 38 miles, 188 degrees
 White Hill, 11 miles, 203 degrees
 Fair Snape Fell, 19 miles, 208 degrees
 Moel Siabod, 99 miles, 221 degrees
 Ward's Stone, 13 miles, 223 degrees
 Carnedd Llewelyn, 95 miles, 224 degrees
 Caton Moor, 12 miles, 236 degrees
 Warton Crag, 15 miles, 266 degrees

West to north
 Snaefell, 84 miles, 275 degrees
 Black Combe, 38 miles, 280 degrees
 Old Man of Coniston, 33 miles, 296 degrees
 Scafell Pike, 38 miles, 302 degrees
 Great Gable, 40 miles, 304 degrees
 Grasmoor, 45 miles, 309 degrees
 Gragareth, 4½ miles, 312 degrees
 Helvellyn, 35 miles, 315 degrees
 High Street, 29 miles, 321 degrees
 Great Coum, 6 miles, 337 degrees
 The Calf, 15 miles, 342 degrees
 Yarlside, 15 miles, 347 degrees
 Cross Fell, 37 miles, 355 degrees
 Whernside, 4 miles, 359 degrees

Gallery

References

External links 

 Ingleborough National Nature Reserve
 Three Peaks of Yorkshire
 Routes to climb Ingleborough
 Climb Ingleborough from Clapham

Marilyns of England
Hewitts of England
Peaks of the Yorkshire Dales
National nature reserves in England
Nuttalls
Sites of Special Scientific Interest in North Yorkshire
Yorkshire Three Peaks
Mountains and hills of the United Kingdom with toposcopes